Thomas Hudson (1701–1779) was an English portrait painter.

Life

Hudson was born in Devon in 1701. His exact birthplace is unknown.  He studied under Jonathan Richardson in London and against his wishes, married Richardson's daughter at some point before 1725.

Hudson was most prolific between 1740 and 1760 and, from 1745 until 1755 was the most successful London portraitist.
He had many assistants, and employed the specialist drapery painter Joseph Van Aken.  Joshua Reynolds,  Joseph Wright and the drapery painter Peter Toms were  his students.

Hudson visited the Low Countries in 1748 and Italy in 1752. In 1753 he bought a house at Cross Deep, Twickenham, just upstream from Pope's Villa.  He retired toward the end of the 1750s.  William Hickey described the elderly Hudson, "His figure was rather grotesque, being uncommonly low in stature, with a prodigious belly, and constantly wearing a large white bushy periwig. He was remarkably good tempered, and one of my first-rate favourites, notwithstanding that he often told me I should certainly be hanged.". He died at Twickenham in 1779. His extensive private art collection was sold off in three separate sales.

Many of Hudson's works may be seen in art galleries throughout the United Kingdom.  They include the National Portrait Gallery, the National Maritime Museum, Tate, Barnstaple Guildhall, Foundling Museum and the Bristol City Museum and Art Gallery.

Death
Hudson died in 1779, aged 77 or 78.

References

External links

Thomas Hudson online (Artcyclopedia)
Thomas Hudson on Artnet
John Singleton Copley in America, a full text exhibition catalog from The Metropolitan Museum of Art, which contains material on Thomas Hudson (see index)

1701 births
1779 deaths
18th-century English painters
English male painters
English portrait painters
Artists from Devon
English art collectors
18th-century English male artists